Wilhelm August Wenz (21 October 1886 – 12 September 1945) was a German malacologist, born in Frankfurt am Main.  He is the author of the 7-part Gastropoda section of Handbuch der Paläozoologie (1938-1944), a very important review that described all known fossil genera.  Only a few copies of this rare work survive: almost the entire stock of later editions was destroyed during the Second World War.

Bibliography
(incomplete)
  Fischer K. & Wenz W. A. (1914) Die Landschneckenkalke des Mainzer Beckens und ihre Fauna.
 Wenz W. (1923-1930) "Gastropoda extramarina tertiaria" Fossilium catalogus, I: Animalia. 3387 pp., published in parts.
  Wenz W. (1938-1944) Teil 1: Allgemeiner Teil und Prosobranchia. In: Schindewolf O. H. (ed.) Handbuch der Paläozoologie, Band 6, Gastropoda, Verlag Gebrüder Bornträger, Berlin, xii + 1639 pp.

References
 Moore, R.C., Lalicker, C.G., and Fischer, A. G., 1952, Invertebrate Fossils, McGraw Hill Book Company, New York; p. 334
 Biographical Etymology of Marine Organism Names. V & W

1886 births
1945 deaths
German malacologists
20th-century German zoologists